Thorntons Creek is a  long 3rd order tributary to the Cape Fear River in Harnett County, North Carolina.

Course
Thorntons Creek rises in a pond about 1.5 miles northwest of Coats, North Carolina and then flows southwest to join the Cape Fear River about 2 miles northwest of Erwin, North Carolina.

Watershed
Thorntons Creek drains  of area, receives about 47.6 in/year of precipitation, has a wetness index of 484.72 and is about 24% forested.

See also
List of rivers of North Carolina

References

Rivers of North Carolina
Rivers of Harnett County, North Carolina
Tributaries of the Cape Fear River